Hydriomena deltoidata is a species of moth in the family Geometridae. It was first described by Francis Walker in 1862. This species is endemic to New Zealand. The classification of New Zealand endemic moths within the genus Hydriomena is regarded as unsatisfactory and in need of revision. As such this species is currently also known as Hydriomena (s.l.) deltoidata. The adults of this moth are known to pollinate Dracophyllum acerosum and Leptospermum scoparium.

References 

Sterrhinae
Moths described in 1862
Moths of New Zealand
Endemic fauna of New Zealand
Taxa named by Francis Walker (entomologist)
Endemic moths of New Zealand